Dr Shimon Kanovitch (6 July 1900 – 25 July 1961) was an Israeli physician and politician who served as a member of the Knesset for the Progressive Party and Liberal Party between 1959 and 1961.

Biography
Born in Germany in 1900, Kanovitch studied medicine at university in Königsberg, Frankfurt and Tübingen, and was certified as a paediatrician. During his youth he joined the Zionist Movement and Zionist student organisations, and later became secretary of the Zionist Federation in Germany.

In 1933 he made aliyah to Mandatory Palestine, and became a lecturer at the medical school in Jerusalem, and also in educational psychology at the Kibbutz Seminary. He was amongst the founders of the New Aliyah Party in 1942, which later formed the basis of the Progressive Party. He was elected to the Knesset on the Progressive Party's list in 1959, but lost his seat in the 1961 elections, by which time the party had merged into the Liberal Party.

He died later in 1961 at the age of 61.

External links

1900 births
1961 deaths
Jewish emigrants from Nazi Germany to Mandatory Palestine
Zionists
University of Königsberg alumni
Goethe University Frankfurt alumni
University of Tübingen alumni
Israeli pediatricians
Israeli educators
Progressive Party (Israel) politicians
New Aliyah Party politicians
Liberal Party (Israel) politicians
Members of the 4th Knesset (1959–1961)
Burials at Nahalat Yitzhak Cemetery